is a Japanese children's literature illustrator and author who has lived in Paris since 1971. She has illustrated more than seventy picture books in over a dozen languages, but is best known for creating the Nora series (1986–1994) and for illustrating the You Are My I Love You collection written by Maryann Cusimano Love.

Biography 
Ichikawa was born on January 15, 1949, in Gifu, Japan. She was raised by a pair of teachers, Harumi and Nobuko Ichikawa, in the Gifu region. In later interviews, Ichikawa mentioned feeling unfulfilled and bored in her hometown, which encouraged her to leave Japan and travel elsewhere.

Ichikawa moved to Paris, France in December 1971 when she was twenty-two, after graduating college in Japan but without a job and unable to speak a word of French. She accepted a job working with children as an au pair while studying the language. Ichikawa had no artistic experience, but began drawing immediately after she saw the work of painter Louis-Maurice Boutet de Monvel (1850–1913) in a bookshop window. Ichikawa remembered falling in love with the artist's work and searching for his books in second hand shops, unsure whether he was alive. By 1979, she was recorded in The Horn Book Magazine as responsible for keeping Boutet de Movel's memory alive. In a 2020 interview with the French magazine Télérama, she recalled her arrival in Paris with wonder:
In need of a job to finance her determination to remain in Paris, Ichikawa visited a bookstore while on vacation in London and copied the names and addresses of the publishing houses of popular children's books. Her first original title was published in by British publisher Heinemann in 1975.

As of 2022, Ichikawa continues to create original children's books from her home in Paris. Many of her titles include depictions of two of her biggest hobbies: dancing and doll collection.

Career 
Ichikawa's stories and illustrations have been published almost every year since she began working in Paris in 1971. Two or three children's books some years have lead to a total of seventy  titles. Ichikawa is not the first Japanese children's artist to find success sharing her work in France. France has translated more Japanese children's books than any other European nation including Yasuko Koide, Haruo Yamashita, Kazuo Iwamura, and Satomi Ichikawa.

Ichikawa has traveled internationally for several weeks annually tro study children or animals. The publications follow her trips, are both stories for children and travel diaries of her journeys and experiences. Many of Satomi's original stories serve as records of her travels to the rainforests of the Amazon, the savannas of Africa, the markets of Morocco, the mountains of Guatemala, and beyond. Though she has traveled extensively, Satomi always returns to her home in Paris, where her favorite location to visit for inspiration is Luxembourg Gardens.

Popular titles 
In the early 1980s Ichikawa spent a month and a half on a solitary vacation at her friend's private castle. She did not intend to work during her stay, but found herself overwhelmingly inspired by her surroundings. She soon crafted the first book in what would eventually become a bestselling series of children's books about a young girl named Nora. Nora's Castle was published first in France and then in the United States in April 1986. The book was well-received by teachers and reviewers so Satomi soon began work on the next one, Nora's Stars, which was published in 1989. Nora's Ducks, Nora's Roses and Nora's Surprise soon followed.

In addition to illustrating dozens of her own titles, Ichikawa has also illustrated many books for other authors. The first book she illustrated in collaboration with another author, Keep Running, Allen! by Clyde Robert Bulla, became an award-winning book that was so successful it has since been translated to at least five languages. She also illustrated several books for author Elizabeth Laird, including Rosy's Garden: A Child's Keepsake of Flowers.

Ichikawa illustrated all seven books in the popular Tanya series by Patricia Lee Gauch between 1989 and 2002. The series follows a hopeful young ballet dancer as she discovered the ups and downs of such a demanding art form. Ichikawa said that Patricia had written the first book at her request, to combine her passions of illustration and classical dance. Ichikawa considers her work on the Tanya series to be one of the highlights of her career. The series was compiled and published as The Tanya Treasury in 2002.

In 2001, Ichikawa created the watercolor illustrations for the book You Are My I Love You written by Maryann Cusimano Love and published by Penguin Random House. The story was written to be read to a child by a parent, with bilingual Spanish-English copies eventually published to encourage childhood multilingual learning and family bonding. By 2012, the series had expanded to include You Are My Wish, You Are My Miracles, and You Are My Wonders. As of 2013, the series sold over million copies and was published in six languages.

Translations 
Nearly all of Ichikawa's publications have been translated to at least two of more than a dozen popular languages. Her work is most commonly published in Dutch, English, French, German, Japanese, and Spanish, though it is not uncommon for her books to be translated to Italian, Korean, Norwegian, and Swedish. Several of her books have even been published in Catalan, Chinese, Danish, and Finnish. The majority of Satomi's English-language original books and translations have been published by Philomel Books, now an imprint of Penguin Random House. The publishing house was created in the early 1980s to share poetic books that were "beautiful in concept and form, and fine enough to be celebrated as gifts." Patricia Lee Gauch served as editor-in-chief from 1985 until 2003, making her the editor in charge of the company when most of Satomi's English works were published. In addditon to publishing many of Satomi Ichikawa's books, Philomel Books was also responsible for the publication of popular titles like Eric Carle's The Very Hungry Caterpillar, Brian Jacques' Redwall series, and Owl Moon by Jane Yolen and John Schoenherr at around the same time.

Harriët Laurey (1924–2004) singlehandedly translated more than half a dozen of Ichikawa's books to Dutch, including all of the books in the Suzanne and Nicholas series. The popular series has been translated to six languages, with the main characters' names shifting accordingly to be more recognizable to children. Though the sibling pair are known as Suzanne and Nicholas in English, they were named Nikkie and Sanne in Dutch, Timm and Tina in German, Annette and Nicolai in Norwegian, and Suzanne became Suzette in French.

One of Satomi's first original children's books, a 32-page book titled Friends (1976), was rediscovered decades after its initial (unknown) release and republished in English, French, German, and Italian in 2019.

Media 
Satomi's work has been reviewed in hundreds of literary magazines, newspapers, websites, and more. Some of the more notable English publications to have discussed her work are Booklist, The Horn Book Magazine, Kirkus Reviews, the Los Angeles Times, The New York Times, and School Library Journal. A review of Nora's Surprise written by Jacqueline Elsner for School Library Journal in May 1994 specifically commended Satomi's illustrations, saying that everything she drew "whether animal, toy, or person, is full of life, humor, and expression in every gesture." Satomi Ichikawa was interviewed by Publishers Weekly for a full-page biographic article that was shared on June 7, 1993. In 2015, Satomi's French publisher L'école des loisirs interviewed the artist about her recent work and published a video of the discussion. Similarly, a bookstore in Hossegor, France recorded a video interview with Satomi in celebration of the town's 5th annual children's book festival in 2019.

Awards and honors 
Satomi Ichikawa's books and illustrations have received numerous international awards, many highlighting her portrayals of diverse characters and stories. For example, her 2006 original book My Father's Shop was the recipient of several awards for her informed representation of a young Moroccan boy learning learning how to speak the languages spoken by his neighbors. The following list is a small selection of the recognitions and honors received by Satomi Ichikawa, her stories, and her illustrations. 
 2014 Selection Award –You Are My I Love You (2001), El día de los niños/El día de los libros, Association for Library Service to Children.
 2007 Honor – My Father's Shop (2006), Children's Africana Book Awards, Africa Access.
 2007 Grades K-2 Selection Award  – My Father's Shop (2006), Outstanding International Books, United States Board on Books for Young People.
 2007 Selection Award – My Father's Shop (2006), Cooperative Children's Book Center, University of Wisconsin–Madison.
 2005 Selection Award – La La Rose (2004), Cooperative Children's Book Center, University of Wisconsin–Madison.
 2003 Selection Award – My Pig Amarillo (2002), Lasting Connections, American Library Association.
 1992 Selection Award – Bravo, Tanya (1992), Cooperative Children's Book Center, University of Wisconsin–Madison.
 1989 Notable Book Award – Dance, Tanya (1989), Association for Library Service to Children, American Library Association.
 1981 Art Award – Keep Running, Allen! (1978), Sankei Children's Book Award.
 1978 Special Mention – Suzanne and Nicholas at the Market (1978), Bologna Children's Book Fair, Bologna, Italy.
 1978 Kodansha Prize – Poems of Spring (1977), Kodansha, Japan.

Publications

Collections 
Satomi Ichikawa's original artwork and publications are held by numerous museums, and institutions around the world. The International Library of Children's Literature at the national library of Japan (National Diet Library) holds more than fifty of her original works, making theirs the largest known collection of Ichikawa's artwork held by a public institution. Satomi Ichikawa's work is held in thousands of international libraries, the majority of which can be found in France, Japan, Germany, the Netherlands, and the United States. The following is a non-exhaustive selection of significant cultural institutions that count Satomi Ichikawa's work amongst their collections.
 Bookworm Children's Library, Taleigão, India. 
 Cotsen Children's Library, Princeton University, New Jersey, United States. 
 German National Library, Frankfurt, Germany. 
 International Library of Children's Literature, National Diet Library, Tokyo, Japan.
 Bibliothèque nationale de France, Paris, France.
 National Library of Korea, Seoul, South Korea.
 Royal Library of the Netherlands, The Hague, Netherlands.
Swiss Institute for Youth and Media, Lausanne, Switzerland.

References 

1949 births
20th-century Japanese women artists
21st-century Japanese women artists
Japanese people
Japanese women
People from Gifu
Artists from Gifu Prefecture
Japanese children's book illustrators
Japanese children's writers
Living people